The Levy Mwanawasa Stadium is a multi-purpose stadium in Ndola, Zambia. It is used mostly for football matches. The stadium has a capacity of 49,800 people. It is located on the T3 Road at the start of the Ndola-Kitwe Dual Carriageway.

In 2010, the Chinese government announced that the stadium will be built. The first international game that was played in the stadium was held on 9 June 2012. It was a world cup qualifier between the host nation Zambia and Ghana which had a result of 1-0 in favour of Zambia.

The stadium is named after Levy Mwanawasa, the third President of Zambia, who served from 2002 to his death in 2008.

References

External links
Levy Mwanawasa Stadium Pictures
Plans for new stadium announced
More plans for stadium
Plans for stadium in Ndola

Football venues in Zambia
Athletics (track and field) venues in Zambia
Multi-purpose stadiums in Zambia
Ndola
Sports venues completed in 2012
Buildings and structures in Copperbelt Province